Ryan Smith (born September 13, 1979 in Kitchener, Ontario) is a former Canadian rugby union player, who played club football for French team US Montauban in the Top 14 division, and represented  at international level. Smith's first appearance for the national side was on June 14, 2003, in a match against England Saxons. Smith played 51 times for Canada, scoring 9 tries, and appeared in the 2003 and 2007 and most recently the (RWC 2011) earning his 51st cap. World Cups. On December 1, 2011 Ryan Smith announced his retirement from all levels of rugby.

References

External links
Profile at Rugbycanada

1979 births
Living people
Canadian rugby union players
Rugby union fly-halves
Rugby union centres
Sportspeople from Kitchener, Ontario
Canada international rugby union players
Canada international rugby sevens players
Male rugby sevens players